The United States Military Academy Preparatory School (USMAPS), sometimes referred to as West Point Prep, is a preparatory school for the United States Military Academy (USMA). Located in West Point, New York, its official mission is "to provide academic, military and physical instruction in a moral-ethical military environment to prepare and motivate candidates for success at the United States Military Academy."

History 
In 1916, the rules for admission to the U.S. service academies changed to include a formal admission process to ensure the appointees' success and excellence.

Between the two World Wars, the U.S. was divided into nine corps areas, and each of these maintained its own West Point Preparatory School, all being supervised by the USMA staff.

Admissions 

As with the prep schools of the other United States service academies, there is no separate application for USMAPS, only the West Point application.  Admission officers will offer USMAPS to potential West Point cadets who have received or yet to receive their Congressional appointments yet may lack the grades or skills necessary for West Point. During the middle of the prep school year, Cadet Candidates must submit new applications to West Point, including the Congressional nomination. By June, Cadet Candidates will receive word of their application status and West Point acceptance. Most of those who attend the prep school will go on to West Point, contingent on their application, academics and grades, physical training, and military instruction. Some candidates may transfer to other service academies, or be sent back to the United States Army as a regular enlisted soldier. Invitational reservists have other options at the completion of the USMAPS year. Invitational reservists who entered USMAPS with no existing contract to the military and are denied admission to West Point or who decline their appointment can return to civilian life with no further obligation.

Cadet candidates and USMAPS instruction 
Students at USMAPS are known as cadet candidates (often abbreviated to "CCs"); board and tuition are free and they are paid a small stipend as they are active members of the U.S. Army. The course extends over a ten-month scholastic year and aims at training the "CCs" to cope with the academic and military rigors of an army education before attending West Point the following academic year.

Cadet candidates arrive at the prep school in mid-July for Cadet Candidate Basic Training, or CCBT, a three-week program to put them in shape and provide the foundation for West Point and military instruction.

Academics 
Immediately following CCBT, academic classes start in August and end in mid-May. USMAPS provides instruction in English, general mathematics, student development, military science, physical and natural sciences, and physical and military training. USMAPS offers Calculus AB classes for advanced cadets. Cadets who are weak in English or mathematics have the opportunity to catch up with fundamental courses.

Athletics 

USMAPS has an extensive athletic program including football, cross-country, track, men's and women's basketball, soccer, lacrosse, and wrestling.

Known as the Black Knights, with black and gold colors, USMAPS primarily participates with the other United States military academy prep schools, especially their rival the Naval Academy Preparatory School. Potential athletes are the most notable group of those sent to USMAPS to upgrade their scholastic abilities.

Types of cadet candidates 

There are two categories of prep school students: Prior Service (PSs) and Invitational Reservists (IRs).

Prior Service 
Prior Service CCs are aged 17 to 22 and have already served in the Army as enlisted soldiers. Prior Service CCs can go direct admit (straight into West Point), but many choose to take an extra year to review high school academic skills. The Prep school offers introductory chemistry, biology, and physics as well as full year courses in English and Math.

Invitational Reservists

Invitational Reservists, or IRs, are recruited high school athletes who typically need to improve their academic grades. In addition, there are also non-athletes straight from high school or junior college who, for many reasons, applied to West Point but were not accepted. The athletes compete against other local colleges, high schools, local leagues, and against the USMA Junior Varsity teams. This also gives the USMA coaches a chance to size up and observe the next year's potentials. Non-recruits may join teams as "walk-ons," and are encouraged to do so to keep fit and in shape for West Point. While not at the top of the list for direct admission, these are the applicants who the Admissions Department has deemed "potential" and so are granted a year at the Prep School to improve the needed areas for admission into West Point of the next year. Usually this is due to a slight deficiency in grades, physical fitness or extracurricular activities.

Location change 
West Point was not USMAPS's first location. In June 1946, USMAPS was founded at Stewart Army Air Field in Newburgh, New York, approximately 16 miles northwest of West Point. The school was moved to Fort Belvoir, Virginia, in 1957 and to Fort Monmouth, New Jersey, in 1975. USMAPS moved to West Point 18 July 2011, when the 2005 Base Realignment and Closure Act closed Fort Monmouth.

References

External links 
 
USMAPS Parent Listserver A website for parents of CCs.
West-Point.org Website with various information pertaining to USMAPS.

Military academies of the United States
United States Military Academy
Military education and training in the United States
High schools in New York (state)
Defunct schools in New Jersey
Defunct schools in Virginia